Sibyl Marston was a wooden schooner cargo ship built by W.A. Boole & Sons of Oakland, California and belonging to the Sibyl Marston Co. Sibyl Marston sank off the coast of Lompoc, California on 12 January 1909.

Overview

On 12 January 1909, Sybil Marston, the largest steam schooner built on the United States West Coast, struck the rocks near Surf Beach, California and ran aground in a storm. She was carrying  of lumber. Two crew members were killed in the disaster.

Shortly after the Sybil Marston disaster, Lompoc residents salvaged the lumber and used it to begin a town lumberyard. Several houses built in Lompoc used lumber from the shipwreck.

Surf Beach and its adjoining coastal area was a dangerous place for ship travel in the time before radar navigational systems made seafaring safer. There are about 30 recorded shipwrecks along the Surf Beach coast.

Location

Sources

References

External links

YouTube video with details of construction, 8 min.

Schooners of the United States
Lumber schooners
Individual sailing vessels
Ships built in Oakland, California
Shipwrecks of the California coast
Maritime incidents in 1909
1907 ships